STST may refer to:

 Single-trunk Steiner tree (STST) a design and topology, see Rectilinear Steiner tree
 Strassenbahn Stansstad-Stans (StSt) a defunct rail company, see List of railway companies in Switzerland
 Argon ST (NASDAQ stock ticker: STST) a subsidiary of Boeing
 Store Status (STST) a command code for the TI-990
 Scott Trimble, aka STST, from full name Scott Thomas Suggs Trimble
 Sounding the Seventh Trumpet, the first studio album by Avenged Sevenfold.
 Subjective total sleep time, a measure of sleep quality

See also
 ST (disambiguation)
 ST2 (disambiguation)